Robinsonekspedisjonen: 2010, is the tenth season of the Norwegian version of the Swedish show Expedition Robinson and it premiered on September 12, 2010. The main twist this season is that the teams are divided up by region of origin with the members of the north team coming from northern Norway and the members of the south team coming from southern Norway. In episode 3, Kristine Ditlefsen, Jeanetter Elstad, Cecilie Heramb, and Tone Olsen all entered the game as jokers with two of each joining one of the two teams. The game changed again in episode 5 when the teams were dissolved and two new teams were formed based on gender. In a twist, in episode 6 Kim Cesar, Synnøve Kalleklev, Lisbeth Larsen, and Bjørnar Rødal entered the game as members of the newly formed west team. Along with this, in episode 6 the contestants temporarily returned to their original teams. However, following a duel in the same episode between David Sandem and Jeanette Elstad, in which Jeanette was eliminated, the two teams merged. Shoretly after the merge took place the remaining contestants were evacuated from the island for about ten days due to a bird flu break out. In episode 7, the west competed in an individual immunity challenge. After the challenge, Kim was eliminated by the winner of the challenge Bjørnar. Following this, Bjørnar along with Lisbeth and Synnøve joined the merge tribe. In episode 12, Atle Hansen and Synnøve competed in a duel against each other in which Synnøve was eliminated and Atle received reward. In the final episode of the season, the four semi-finalists initially competed in the plank competition. Following the challenge Tone was voted out of the game by the winner and first finalist Alita Kristensen. Then the two remaining losers of the first competition, Atle and Stian Schie, competed in a final duel. Stian won and became the second finalist. Eventually, Alita Dagmar Kristensen won the season over Stian Schie by a jury vote of 8-3, becoming the first contestant to have begun the competition on the North team to win since 2004.

Finishing order

The game

: Following their win at the immunity challenge, the north team was allowed to give one member of the south team immunity at tribal council. The north team chose to give immunity to David.

:  During the immunity challenge, Christer revealed an individual immunity idol back at the starting line. The first person from the losing team to reach this idol would have immunity at the second tribal council. As Arvid reached it first, he was immune at the second tribal council.

:  As Maria was the only person not to receive an amulet at the second tribal council, she was eliminated from the game.

:  At the third tribal council, both Alita and Ken had two votes they could cast as opposed to just one.

:  Following their win at the immunity challenge, the south team was allowed to give one member of the north team immunity at tribal council. The south team chose to give immunity to Ken.

:  At the fifth immunity challenge, Tone, having won the challenge for the newly formed Women's tribe, was given the power to choose who of the men would have immunity at the fifth tribal council through shooting plates that had their names on them. As both David and Stian's plates were still intact when Tone ran out of bullets they both had immunity at the fifth tribal council. In addition to this, David and Stian were the only ones who could vote at the fifth tribal council.

: Jeanette was eliminated after losing a duel against David.

: Following an individual immunity challenge that only the West team competed in, Bjørnar, as the winner, was told that he had to immediately vote out one member of the team. He chose to eliminate Kim.

: As both Cecilie and Daniel received five votes at the seventh tribal council, all of the other contestants were told they had to vote again in a re-vote.

: At the ninth tribal council, the contestant that received the most votes would be forced to compete in a duel against their partner from the reward challenge. As a result, David faced off in a duel against Bjørnar to determine who would be eliminated. Ultimately, David won the duel.

: At the tenth tribal council, Synnøve was immune as she had bought immunity during the auction that took place at the reward challenge.

: As the contestants were temporarily split into two groups following the reward challenge, two immunity challenges took place.

 During the second vote at the eleventh tribal councils, only David and Kristine could be voted for and could not vote.

 Synnøve was eliminated after losing a duel to Atle.

 As Atle won the duel against Synnøve, he was also given reward which he could share with one other person.

 As Kristine received the most votes in the second vote at the twelfth tribal council, she was forced to compete in a duel against Stian, which she lost.

 As Tone was technically the last person voted out of the game, she was allowed to vote twice during the jury vote.

Voting History

 At the first tribal council, David was given immunity by the north team.
 As Arvid won individual immunity at the second immunity challenge, he was immune at the second tribal council.
 As Arvid had immunity at the second tribal council, he was asked to give one person immunity through an amulet. By giving this person immunity he was voting to keep this person in the game. That person would then be asked to give someone else immunity and so on until only one person would be left without an amulet and would be eliminated from the game.
 As new contestants, Jeanette and Kristine had the right to give one tribemate each the right to a second vote at tribal council. Jeanette chose to give Alita the right to a second vote, while Kristine gave this power to Ken.
 At the fourth tribal council, Ken was given immunity by the south team.
 At the fifth tribal council, as David and Stian had immunity they were the only members on the men's tribe that were eligible to vote.
 Following his win at the West team's immunity challenge, Bjørnar was the only one permitted to vote.
 At the seventh tribal council, both Cecilie and Daniel received five votes. as Daniel received more votes in the re-vote he was eliminated. 
 At the ninth tribal council, the contestant that received the most votes would be forced to compete in a duel against their partner from the reward challenge. As a result, David faced off in a duel against Bjørnar to determine who would be eliminated. Ultimately, David won the duel.
 During the second vote at the eleventh tribal council, only David and Kristine could be voted for and were not allowed to vote.  
 As Atle and Kristine both received votes during the initial vote at the twelfth tribal council, they were the only two who could receive votes during the second vote to determine who would face off against Stian in a duel. As Kristine received more votes she faced Stian in the duel in which she lost and was eliminated.
 As Tone was technically the last person voted out of the game, she was allowed to vote twice during the jury vote.

References

External links
https://web.archive.org/web/20110809095451/http://www.tv3.no/robinsonekspedisjonen

 2010
2010 Norwegian television seasons